Kwame Adjeman-Pamboe (born 24 October 1987), is an English/American professional soccer player who plays as a winger.

Club career

Youth and college
Adjeman-Pamboe grew up in Bowie, Maryland, attended Eleanor Roosevelt High School, played club soccer for the Bethesda Raptors and Columbia United, and played two years of college soccer at Saint Francis University before transferring to George Mason University as a junior. In his senior season at George Mason he was named the Most Outstanding Player at the CAA Men's Soccer Championship, was a CAA All-Tournament Team selection, a First-Team NSCAA All-South Atlantic Region selection, and a First-Team All-CAA selection.

Professional
Adjeman-Pamboe was selected in the 2009 MLS SuperDraft (28th overall) by Colorado Rapids, but after trialling with them was not offered a contract by the club. Adjeman-Pamboe instead signed with Finnish club Viikingit in August 2009 and spent one year with the team, scoring 4 goals in 9 Ykkönen appearances.

Adjeman-Pamboe returned to the United States in 2010, and signed the FC Tampa Bay of the USSF Division 2 Professional League in January.

In February 2011, he returned to his country of birth, England, and signed for Barnet. On February 26, 2011, Kwame made his debut coming off the bench in added time against Lincoln City replacing Sam Deering. He left Barnet at the end of the 2010-11 season.

In Summer 2011, Adjeman-Pamboe joined Agrotikos. He scored his first goal for Agrotikos against Kallithea, with his team winning 1–0. In January 2013, he joined Panachaiki, leaving at the end of the season.

In December 2013, he joined El Qanah in the Egyptian Premier League, scoring on his debut against Ismaily on December 25, in a 1–2 loss. He scored his second goal in a 1–1 draw against Wadi Degla on January 29, 2014.

In November 2018, he joined Jordanian Pro League side Al-Salt, becoming the first English footballer to play in Jordan.

References

External links
 
 
 
 George Mason bio
 KTFF profile

1987 births
Living people
American soccer players
English footballers
Tampa Bay Rowdies players
Barnet F.C. players
Panachaiki F.C. players
Footballers from Greater London
People from Bowie, Maryland
George Mason Patriots men's soccer players
George Mason University alumni
Saint Francis University alumni
Association football forwards
English emigrants to the United States
English people of Ghanaian descent
American sportspeople of Ghanaian descent
Association football wingers
Soccer players from Maryland
Ykkönen players
USSF Division 2 Professional League players
English Football League players
Football League (Greece) players
Jordanian Pro League players
Al-Salt SC players
American expatriate soccer players
Expatriate footballers in Finland
Expatriate footballers in Greece
Expatriate footballers in Egypt
Expatriate footballers in Northern Cyprus
Expatriate footballers in Jordan
American expatriate sportspeople in Finland
American expatriate sportspeople in Greece
American expatriate sportspeople in Egypt
American expatriate sportspeople in Northern Cyprus
American expatriate sportspeople in Jordan
English expatriate footballers
English expatriate sportspeople in Finland
English expatriate sportspeople in Greece
English expatriate sportspeople in Egypt
English expatriate sportspeople in Northern Cyprus
English expatriate sportspeople in Jordan
Colorado Rapids draft picks
Black British sportsmen